Rum is a distilled alcoholic beverage made from sugarcane by-products such as molasses or sugar cane juice.

Rum may also refer to:

Islam and the Near-Eastern Christians
 Rum (endonym), a term meaning "Romans" historically used by Muslims to refer to the Eastern Roman Empire ("Byzantines") and geographically Asia Minor, the heartland of the Empire, in the Middle Ages as well as being used by the present day Middle-Eastern Christians of the Antiochian Patriarchate and Jerusalem Patriarchate to refer to themselves as Rûm Orthodox, especially by the Arab Orthodox Christians
 Ar-Rum, translated as "the Romans" or "the Byzantines," the 30th sura of the Qur'an
 Rumelia, the "land of the Romans", the Balkan provinces of the Ottoman Empire
 Sultanate of Rûm, a Seljuk sultanate, established on conquered Byzantine territory of Asia Minor from 1077 to 1307
 Baciyan-i Rum

Geography
Places named Rum include:
 Rùm (or Rum or Rhum), Scottish island
 Rum, Austria, Tyrolean market town
 Rum Cay, Bahamas island
 Rum Hill, a mountain in Otsego County, New York
 Rum, Hungary, village
 Rum, Iran, a village in South Khorasan Province
 Rum Island (Tasmania), Australian island
 Rum River, waterway near Minneapolis, Minnesota, USA

Media
"Rum", song by Alestorm from the album Back Through Time
 "Rum" (song), a song by Brothers Osborne
 Rum (film), a 2017 Indian film

See also 
 RUM (disambiguation)